Jurkka is a Finnish surname. Notable people with the surname include:

Emmi Jurkka (1899–1990), Finnish actress, and the mother of Jussi and Sakari
Jussi Jurkka (1930–1982), Finnish actor
Sakari Jurkka (1923–2012), Finnish actor
Timo Jurkka (born 1963), Finnish actor

See also
Jurka

Finnish-language surnames